The domain name info is a generic top-level domain (gTLD) in the Domain Name System (DNS) of the Internet. The name is derived from information, although registration requirements do not prescribe any particular purpose.

The TLD info was a response to ICANN's highly publicized announcement, in late 2000, of a phased release of seven new generic top-level domains. The event was the first addition of major gTLDs since the Domain Name System was developed in the 1980s. The seven new gTLDs, selected from over 180 proposals, were meant in part to take the pressure off the  domain.

History
Domain info has been operated by Afilias since its creation.  In 2003, it was the first gTLD domain to support IETF standards-based internationalized domain names. In 2001, Afilias CTO (Ram Mohan) discovered problems with the Universal Acceptance of the domain due to it being the first tld whose length was greater than two or three characters.  

The launching of info involved a "Sunrise Period" for trademark owners, followed by a "landrush" open to all, the first time such a process had ever been conducted for a new gTLD. This process received criticism for giving trademarks precedence over words that are generic in other contexts; for instance, the Caterpillar construction equipment company was able to register  before more generic users, such as feline enthusiasts, were allowed to register.

Although a large number of fraudulent registrations were initially made by registrants who did not actually own a valid trademark, a challenge procedure later weeded out most of these.

Prior to launch, the names of countries were reserved from registration at the request of ICANN, to the consternation of those who had paid pre-registration fees to attempt to register these names in the landrush. ICANN's Governmental Advisory Committee, composed of country representatives from around the world applauded the move, the first by any major domain to protect the national interests of sovereign nations.

Usage
Domain info has been the most successful of the seven new domain names, with over 5.2 million domain names in the registry as of April 2008. After the September 11, 2001 attacks in the United States, the Metropolitan Transportation Authority of New York switched to the easier to remember mta.info website to lead users to latest information on schedules and route changes on the area's transportation services. ICANN and Afilias have also sealed an agreement for country names to be reserved by ICANN under resolution 01.92.

Info is an unrestricted domain, meaning that anyone can obtain a second-level domain for any purpose, similar to the domains com, net and org. This is in contrast to TLDs such as edu, or coop. Info is the only top-level domain that was explicitly created and chartered for unrestricted use, although various other TLDs resulted in this situation de facto.  Info stands for information in about 37 languages, and is a neutral name.

Afilias, the registry operator of both the info and aero top-level domains, has been aggressive in its marketing of the domain, with significant registrar incentives and outreach events.

References

External links
 .info Registry Agreement with ICANN
 Domebase, a site with commentary and studies regarding the .info launch

Generic top-level domains
Council of European National Top Level Domain Registries members
Computer-related introductions in 2001

sv:Toppdomän#Generiska toppdomäner